Będkowice may refer to the following places in Poland:
Będkowice, Lower Silesian Voivodeship (south-west Poland)
Będkowice, Lesser Poland Voivodeship (south Poland)